Galton Blackiston is an English chef, born in Norfolk. The restaurant of his hotel, Morston Hall, Holt in Morston, is Michelin starred and has 4 AA rosettes. It is on the north Norfolk coast, two miles from Blakeney. His unusual first name is a tribute to his relative Sir Francis Galton.

Blackiston has never trained formally as a chef. After leaving school at 16 to play cricket, he was encouraged by his mother to set up a market stall selling homemade baked goods, "Galton's Goodies". His first job in a restaurant was at John Tovey's Miller Howe country hotel in Windermere, the Lake District.

In 2013, Blackiston started No 1 Cromer, a fish and chip shop in Cromer.

Television

Blackiston represented the Midlands and East of England in the BBC's Great British Menu, knocking out celebrity chef Antony Worrall Thompson to gain a place in the final. In 2007, he appeared on the television programme Food Poker.

Personal life
Blackiston supports Norwich City F.C.

Bibliography
Blackiston has published four books on cookery, with the fourth arriving in October 2017.

References

External links
 Bio at BBC Food
 Galton Blackiston's official site
 Morston Hall Hotel
 Bio info at Waitrose.com review

Living people
People from North Norfolk (district)
English television chefs
1964 births
Head chefs of Michelin starred restaurants